The Cumberland County Courthouse is a historic courthouse building located at Cumberland, Cumberland County, Virginia.  It was built by Dabney Cosby (c. 1793-August, 1862), a master builder for Thomas Jefferson, in 1818.  It is a brick, one-story, rectangular, gable-roofed courthouse.  The building features the Tuscan order throughout and a tetrastyle portico.  Also included are the contributing small, brick, one-story clerks office; the brick, two-story, gable-roofed former jail; and Confederate Civil War monument (1901).

It was listed on the National Register of Historic Places in 1994. It is included in the Cumberland Court House Historic District

References

External links
Cumberland County Courthouse, U.S. Route 60, Cumberland, Cumberland County, VA: 3 photos and 2 photo caption pages at Historic American Buildings Survey
Cumberland County Courthouse, Clerk's Office, U.S. Route 60, Cumberland, Cumberland County, VA: 1 photo at Historic American Buildings Survey

Historic American Buildings Survey in Virginia
National Register of Historic Places in Cumberland County, Virginia
Buildings and structures in Cumberland County, Virginia
County courthouses in Virginia
Government buildings completed in 1818
Courthouses on the National Register of Historic Places in Virginia
Individually listed contributing properties to historic districts on the National Register in Virginia